The New Cathedral of Lleida (Catalan Catedral Nova de Lleida) or Seu Nova is the seat of the Bishop of Lleida, located in Lleida, Catalonia.

History
The current cathedral replaced the earlier cathedral, La Seu Vella, Lleida located in the highest point in town, and for a time used as a garrison. The church was constructed in an early Neoclassical-style in using designs by Pedro Martín Cermeño and construction directed by Francisco Sabatini. The austere building was built with local gray stone, but with a coat of arms of the ruling House of Bourbon.
It has two large flanking bell towers, joined by a terrace with a balustrade.

See also
List of bishops of Lleida

External links 

 (Catalan) Bisbat de Lleida

References 

Roman Catholic cathedrals in Catalonia
19th-century Roman Catholic church buildings in Spain
Neoclassical architecture in Catalonia
Lleida
Neoclassical church buildings in Spain